The  Nippon Professional Baseball season ended with the Seibu Lions defeating the Chunichi Dragons in the 2004 Japan Series. This season also saw the first and only players strike in Japanese professional baseball history. Players went on strike for two days in September because of the potential mergers and realignment.

Format

Central League
 Season Format
 Regular Season
 Regular Season 1st place is the champion

Pacific League
 Season Format
 Regular Season
 Playoff 1st Stage: Regular Season 2nd place vs. Regular Season 3rd place – Best of 3
 Playoff 2nd Stage: Regular Season 1st place vs. Playoff 1st Stage winner – Best of 5
 Playoff 2nd Stage winner is the champion

Japan Series
 Central League champion vs. Pacific League champion – Best of 7

Standings
Note:Two games for each team are cancelled due to players' strike

Central League

Regular season

Pacific League

Regular season

Playoff 1st Stage
Seibu Lions (2) vs. Hokkaido Nippon-Ham Fighters (1)

Playoff 2nd Stage
Fukuoka Daiei Hawks (2) vs. Seibu Lions (3)

Japan Series

Chunichi Dragons (3) vs. Seibu Lions (4)

See also
2004 Major League Baseball season

References